Benzo[a]fluoranthene is an organic compound with the chemical formula C20H12.

References 

Polycyclic aromatic hydrocarbons